The Department of Economics of the University of Pennsylvania (commonly referred to as Penn Economics) is part of the school's Arts and Sciences division. Penn Economics is generally associated with the saltwater school of economic thought (along with University of California, Berkeley, Brown University, Harvard University, Princeton University, Columbia University, MIT and Yale University). It is located in the Ronald O. Perelman Center for Political Science and Economics in Philadelphia, Pennsylvania.

History

The social sciences began to be offered in Penn's curriculum beginning in the 1870s. Then, Robert Ellis Thompson (1844–1924) was chosen as Penn's first Professor of Social Sciences in 1874. In 1883, Edmund J. James, the first professor of economics, joined the university as a professor and began teaching courses in economics. He was a founding member of the American Economic Association and the American Academy of Political and Social Science. Other notably economists who joined the department in the nineteenth century included Roland P. Falkner (1888), James Harvey Robinson (1891), Albert S. Bolles (1891), Sidney Sherwood (1891), Emory R. Johnson (1893), and Joseph French Johnson (1893).

The university as a whole modeled its graduate school on the German model of education, emphasizing a combination of research and pedagogy. Upon graduation, students received a Bachelor of Science in Economics.

In 2013, the department received $25 million for the establishment of the Ronald O. Perelman Center for Political Science and Economics, where it currently resides.

Academics
The Department's undergraduate program is one of the largest in the School of Arts and Sciences. Students enrolled in Wharton as undergraduates share some of the classes with students from the Economics Department, but the two degrees have otherwise separate curriculum. The department offers two majors: an economics major and a mathematical economics major.

It also offers graduate courses leading to a Ph.D. in economics.  There are currently more than 100 students within the graduate program.

Penn Institute for Economic Research
The Department houses the Penn Institute for Economic Research (PIER). Founded in 1993 with a donation from William P. Carey, an American philanthropist and businessman, PIER conducts academic research and publishes a working paper series. Its former directors include Lawrence R. Klein, Antonio Merlo, and Enrique G. Mendoza.

Academic journals
The Department is the editorial home of the International Economic Review, one of the leading general audience journals in economics. It is also affiliated with Capitalism: A Journal of History and Economics.

Rankings
Penn Economics is currently ranked 10th in the United States by U.S. News & World Report, 10th in the world by The World University Rankings by the Times Higher Education, 8th in the world by the Academic Ranking of World Universities, 7th in the world by Tilburg University Economic Rankings, and 16th in the world by IDEAS.

Notable alumni
Ignazio Visco, Governor of the Bank of Italy
Kim Choongsoo, Governor of the Bank of Korea
Joaquin Vial, Board Member  Central Bank of Chile
Lars-Hendrik Röller, Germany's Chief Economic Adviser
Ernesto J. Cordero, Mexico's Minister of Finance
José Julián Sidaoui, Deputy Governor of the Bank of Mexico
Jeffrey Harris, Professor at MIT
Alfonso Prat Gay, former Governor of the Central Bank of Argentina
Alassane Ouattara, President of Côte d'Ivoire (Ivory Coast)
Morton O. Schapiro, President of Northwestern University
Nariman Behravesh, President of Global Insight, the world's largest economics organization
Winnie Monsod, former President of the Philippines National Economic and Development Authority
Nancy Stokey, Frederick Henry Prince Distinguished Service Professor of Economics at the University of Chicago
Edmond Villani, Director of Cohen & Steers, Inc.
Marc Ivaldi, Member of the Toulouse School of Economics
Gonzalo Garland, Executive Vice President of IE Foundation and professor at IE Business School

References

External links
 Official Page
 Penn Institute for Economic Research
 International Economic Review

Economics schools
University of Pennsylvania